Slordax: The Unknown Enemy is a vertically scrolling shooter developed and published by Softdisk in 1991. The developers of the game left to found id Software soon after its creation, and Slordax was also marketed by Softdisk as part of The Lost Game Collection of ID Software along with several games created by id on contract for Softdisk.

Plot
Seven centuries ago, a war was waged by the Slordax that lasted a hundred years as they tried to conquer the universe. Currently the Intergalactic Defense Alliance (I.D.A.) believes that Slordax will return and start another devastating war. The I.D.A. sends a fighter pilot in a RedDog Adaptive Strike Ship to destroy the enemy bases in the Slordian galaxy before the Slordax can build their forces.

Gameplay
The player moves through five stages destroying enemies, avoiding traps and collecting powerups. When the player reaches the end point of the stage, all enemies on screen must be destroyed to proceed to the next stage. The player begins with a single shot projection and a two lives. When the player's ship is destroyed, a life is lost and the ship's firepower resets back to a single shot. After all five stages are completed, the game loops back to the first stage.

Development
Development was being done in conjunction with Shadow Knights around 1990. At the time Commander Keen in Invasion of the Vorticons was in development outside working hours with Softdisk. Slordax was the first game to make use of Tile Editor v1.01 (TED1).

References

External links
Official website

1991 video games
DOS games
DOS-only games
Video games set in outer space
Vertically scrolling shooters
Video games developed in the United States
Softdisk